Iveta Benešová and Barbora Záhlavová-Strýcová were the defending champions but were eliminated in the first round.

Květa Peschke and Katarina Srebotnik defeated American duo Liezel Huber and Lisa Raymond in the final, 6–1, 4–6, [13–11] to claim the title.

Seeds

Draw

Draw

References
Main Draw

Apia International Sydney - Women's Doubles
Women's Doubles